Nagaa Rajab is a village inside Qus with a population of 24,796 and an area of 43 acres Ragab, an estate belonging to the village of Shaba, affiliated to Qena Governorate in the Arab Republic of Egypt.

References

External links 

Cities in ancient Egypt
Ancient Greek archaeological sites in Egypt
Roman sites in Egypt
Populated places in Qena Governorate
Qus Markaz villages
Qus